The Amsterdam University of the Arts is a Dutch vocational university of arts located in Amsterdam.

The university consists of:
 Academy of Architecture
 Academy of Theatre and Dance
 Breitner Academy - education in arts
 Conservatorium van Amsterdam - music academy
 Netherlands Film Academy
 Reinwardt Academy - museology studies

Notable alumni
 Lotte de Beer, opera director
 Piet Zwart (1885–1977), graphic designer, industrial designer and typographer

References

External links
  Official website